Briskin is a surname. Notable people with the surname include:

Alan Briskin, American sociologist
Bernard Briskin (1924–2020), American businessman, son of Samuel
Irving Briskin (1903–1981), American film producer
Jacqueline Briskin (1927–2014), British-born American writer
Samuel J. Briskin (1896–1968), American film producer